Khost suicide bombing may refer to:
 2008 Khost suicide bombing
 2015 Khost suicide bombing